In chemistry a carbenoid is a reactive intermediate that shares reaction characteristics with a carbene. In the Simmons–Smith reaction the carbenoid intermediate is a zinc / iodine complex that takes the form of

I-CH2-Zn-I

This complex reacts with an alkene to form a cyclopropane just as a carbene would do.

Carbenoids appear as intermediates in many other reactions. In one system a carbenoid chloroalkyllithium reagent is prepared in situ from a sulfoxide and t-BuLi which reacts the boronic ester to give an ate complex. The ate complex undergoes a 1,2-metallate rearrangement to give the homologated product, which is then further oxidised to a secondary alcohol.

The enantiopurity of the chiral sulfoxide is preserved in the ultimate product after oxidation of the boronic ester to the alcohol indicating that a true carbene was never involved in the sequence.

See also
 The silicon pendant: Silylenoids

References 

Carbenes